East Main Street Historic District is a national historic district located at Christiansburg, Montgomery County, Virginia.  The district encompasses 45 contributing buildings and 1 contributing site in the town of Christiansburg. It includes principally single family brick and frame dwellings dated to the late-19th and early-20th centuries.  They are reflective of a variety of popular architectural styles, in including Colonial Revival and Queen Anne. It also includes two early 19th century log houses, St. Thomas Episcopal Church, the much altered Christiansburg Municipal Building, the early 20th century former Christiansburg High School buildings, and an elementary school.

It was listed on the National Register of Historic Places in 1991.

Gallery

References

Historic districts in Montgomery County, Virginia
Queen Anne architecture in Virginia
Colonial Revival architecture in Virginia
National Register of Historic Places in Montgomery County, Virginia
Historic districts on the National Register of Historic Places in Virginia